Kunzea acuminata is a flowering plant in the myrtle family, Myrtaceae and is endemic to the south-west of Western Australia where it has a restricted distribution. It is a shrub with a few spindly branches, silky leaves and spherical groups of pink flowers on the ends of the branches.

Description
The leaves have long, silky hairs along their margins. The flowers are arranged in roughly spherical heads containing eight to fifteen flowers on the ends of the branches which continue to grow after flowering. Flowering occurs in September.

Taxonomy and naming
This species was first formally described in 1996 by Hellmut Toelken and the description was published in Journal of the Adelaide Botanic Garden. The specific epithet (acuminata) is a Latin word meaning "pointed" or "sharpened".

Distribution and habitat
This kunzea is only known from an area east of Israelite Bay where it grows in sandy soil over granite.

Conservation
Kunzea acuminata is classified as "not threatened" by the Western Australian Government Department of Parks and Wildlife.

References

acuminata
Endemic flora of Western Australia
Myrtales of Australia
Rosids of Western Australia
Plants described in 1996
Taxa named by Hellmut R. Toelken